Gina Young is an American writer, director, playwright, songwriter and performer. They are a vocal member of the LGBTQ community and is openly queer and nonbinary, using both she and they pronouns. She is a member of The Dramatists Guild, The Ring of Keys, and The Kilroys. They are a winner of the HUMANITAS/PLAY LA Prize, and the Jane Chambers Award for Playwriting for their play Femmes: A Tragedy. She was previously known for recording and touring with the music and performance art group Team Gina, which disbanded in 2010.

As a performer, Young has been called "hugely talented" and reviews of her performance touring with the It Gets Better musical said she "captivated the audience with her folksy mezzo sound and easily relatable performance as an actress."

Young is also the creator of the popular SORORITY performance salon which has been presented by the Hammer Museum in Los Angeles, and the conceptual project Feminist Acting Class, which has been presented by the Women's Center for Creative Work. Academic Daisy Marsden says, "Young challenges the traditional, hierarchical structure of a learning environment and challenges conventional notions of gender, drawing attention to the oppressive structures in place."

Young's project BUTCH BALLET, presented by REDCAT in the Summer of 2017, is a groundbreaking movement-theater piece created for and with a cast of butch women, trans men and gender nonconforming performers from diverse backgrounds.

Honors and awards
 HUMANITAS/PLAY LA Prize
 The Jane Chambers Award for Playwriting
 Finalist, Center Theatre Group's Richard E. Sherwood Award

References 

American dramatists and playwrights
Living people
Year of birth missing (living people)
Non-binary writers